Commander Khassaraporn Suta (Thai:  เกษราภรณ์ สุตา; born December 12, 1971) is a Thai weightlifter who competed in the women's 58 kg at the 2000 Summer Olympics and won the bronze medal with a combined lift of 210.0 kg.

References

External links
databaseOlympics.com

1971 births
Living people
Khassaraporn Suta
Khassaraporn Suta
Weightlifters at the 2000 Summer Olympics
Khassaraporn Suta
Olympic medalists in weightlifting
Asian Games medalists in weightlifting
Weightlifters at the 1994 Asian Games
Weightlifters at the 1998 Asian Games
Medalists at the 2000 Summer Olympics
Khassaraporn Suta
Khassaraporn Suta
Medalists at the 1998 Asian Games
Medalists at the 1994 Asian Games
Khassaraporn Suta
Khassaraporn Suta
Khassaraporn Suta
Khassaraporn Suta